Tiago Augusto Oliveira Castro (born 31 January 1996) is a Portuguese professional footballer who plays as a left midfielder for  club Paris 13 Atletico currently goalkeeper coach of Primeira Liga club Paços de Ferreira.

Career
On 13 December 2015, Castro made his professional debut with Vitória Guimarães B in a 2015–16 Segunda Liga match against Sporting Covilhã.

On 17 August 2021, Castro signed for French club Paris 13 Atletico.

Honours
Paris 13 Atletico

 Championnat National 2: 2021–22

References

External links

Stats and profile at LPFP 

1996 births
Sportspeople from Guimarães
Living people
Portuguese footballers
Association football midfielders
Sporting CP footballers
S.C. Braga players
Vitória S.C. players
Vitória S.C. B players
Vitória F.C. players
U.D. Leiria players
Paris 13 Atletico players
Liga Portugal 2 players
Primeira Liga players
Campeonato de Portugal (league) players
Championnat National 2 players
Portuguese expatriate footballers
Expatriate footballers in France
Portuguese expatriate sportspeople in France